John Croke (died c. 1600) was an English politician.

He was a member (MP) of the Parliament of England for Southampton in 1571. He also served as Mayor of Southampton for 1568–69 and 1584–85.

References

16th-century births
1600 deaths

Year of birth unknown

Year of death uncertain
English MPs 1571
Mayors of Southampton